The following lists events that happened during 1961 in Laos.

Incumbents
Monarch: Savang Vatthana 
Prime Minister: Boun Oum

Events
31 January-6 June - Battle of Ban Pa Dong

January
January - The Battle of Luang Namtha begins.

April
19 April - Project Hotfoot (Laos) ends.

March
13 March - Operation Millpond begins.

December
13 December - Operation Pincushion begins.

References

 
1960s in Laos
Years of the 20th century in Laos
Laos
Laos